Forbidden Paradise 3: The Quest for Atlantis is the third album in the Forbidden Paradise series. It is the first album in the series to be mixed by well-known trance DJ/producer Tiësto.  As with the rest of the Forbidden Paradise series, the album is a live turntable mix.

Track listing

References

Tiësto compilation albums
1995 compilation albums